Richard Knott Durning  (October 10, 1892 – September 23, 1948) was a pitcher in Major League Baseball. He pitched in one game for the Brooklyn Robins in each of the 1917 and 1918 baseball seasons.

External links

1892 births
1948 deaths
Baseball players from Louisville, Kentucky
Major League Baseball pitchers
Brooklyn Robins players
Lynn Fighters players
Lynn Pirates players
Fitchburg Burghers players
Portland Beavers players
Newark Bears (IL) players